Aphonnic, sometimes stylized as APHONNIC, is a spanish alternative metal-band from Vigo that was formed in 2001 from the ashes of the band O Pequeno Baltimore. In their early years, their sound was nu metal-oriented and most of their lyrics were written and sung in english. However, since 2006's "6 Bajo Par", the band switched to only spanish lyrics. In recent work the music has become metalcore-oriented.

The group has been awarded with some local awards. Including Maketon given by Los 40 Vigo to the best album of a local group, which has been won by the band 3 years in a row. They were also awarded with the Martín Codax Prize in the metal category year 2017.

Members 
Chechu - vocals
Iago - guitars
Richy - bass
Alén - drums

Discography 
 Silencce (2003)
 Foolproof (2006)
 6 Bajo Par (2009)
 Héroes (2013)
 Indomables (2016)
 La Reina (2020)

References

External links 
 Official Website

Spanish alternative metal musical groups
Metalcore musical groups
Spanish heavy metal musical groups
Nu metal musical groups